The Empire Manufacturing Company Building located in the Old Fourth Ward neighborhood of Atlanta, Georgia.

The building was built in 1939 by the North Carolina firm of Jackson & Edney for the National Linen Service Corporation which in 1962, merged with Zep to become National Service Industries, Inc.  In the late 1990s, renovation of the building was started to convert the building into loft office space as a part of the Southern Dairies redevelopment. In February 2002, the building was added the National Register of Historic Places.

The building was built with "a clear span truss system that permitted a 95-foot span without any supporting members to break up the floor space".  It has Art Deco architecture.

See also
Southern Dairies, located on the same block, also NRHP-listed

References

External links
 http://www.nps.gov/nr/publications/sample_nominations/EmpireManufacturingCoBldg.pdf

Art Deco architecture in Georgia (U.S. state)
Commercial buildings completed in 1939
Fulton County, Georgia
Industrial buildings and structures on the National Register of Historic Places in Georgia (U.S. state)
Buildings and structures in Atlanta
National Register of Historic Places in Atlanta